Kato Achaia railway station is a railway station in Kato Achaia in the northwestern Peloponnese, Greece. The station is on the former Patras–Kyparissia line and is served by Proastiakos Patras Services.

History
The station opened in December 1888 as Achaia railway station and was the westward terminus of the line from Patras, until a year later, the line was extended to Pyrgos. With the cancellation of the routes of the Patras-Kyparissia metric railway line, its facilities remained inactive.

In 1970 OSE became the legal successor to the SEK, taking over responsibilities for most of Greece's rail infrastructure. On 1 January 1971, the station and most of Greek rail infrastructure were transferred to the Hellenic Railways Organisation S.A., a state-owned corporation. Freight traffic declined sharply when the state-imposed monopoly of OSE for the transport of agricultural products and fertilisers ended in the early 1990s. Many small stations of the network with little passenger traffic were closed down. In 2005 operations from the station were suspended due to the reconstruction works of the OSE railway network in the region. In 2009, with the Greek debt crisis unfolding OSE's Management was forced to reduce services across the network. Timetables were cut back, and routes closed as the government-run entity attempted to reduce overheads. The station reopened on 9 July 2010 as part of the Proastiakos Patras services, served by trains between Agios Andreas and Agios Vassilios stations. Since the suspension of regional services on the metre-gauge railways of the Peloponnese in 2011, the station is used only by local Proastiakos trains which currently connect the city with the suburbs of Rio and Kaminia. In 2017 OSE's passenger transport sector was privatised as TrainOSE, currently, a wholly owned subsidiary of Ferrovie dello Stato Italiane infrastructure, including stations, remained under the control of OSE. 

It reopened on 29 February 2020 as a terminal station when Line 2 of the Patras Suburban Railway began operating with the extension of its routes to the town of Kato Achaia Due to the abandonment of the adjacent old station building, Line 2 services started with the (temporary) solution of using a pre-facility which includes chemical toilets.  It serves both Kato Achaia and the nearby settlements, villages and areas, as well as the broader area of Western Achaia. It is located at the junction of the PEO Patras-Pyrgos roads and the Kato Achaias-Arlas provincial road.

Service were suspended due to the coronavirus pandemic, becoming the starting point of the new Line 2 of the Suburban Railway to the town of Kato Achaia. With the resumption of services on 4 July 2020, it was replaced as the starting point of Line 2 by Agios Andreas.

The station also serves as the starting point of the TRAINOSE bus services that connect Patras with Aigio and Kiato via Diakoptos, where the starting point of Odontotos is located. The railway response takes place at these three stations with the Athens Suburban Railway. The trains of the latter run on the line Airport-Patras, the construction of which has been completed to Rododafni Achaia.

Facilities
The station has toilets but is unstaffed. 

Within a few meters distance from the station, there is the Patras Railway Museum open-air showroom which hosts a very old locomotive of the Piraeus, Athens and Peloponnese Railways (SPAP) No. Zs 7.532

Services
The station is served by the Agios Andreas–Rio line of the Proastiakos, with another line running from the Agios Andreas terminus to Kaminia pending the extension to Kato Achaia. Rail services are provided by OSE trains (Stadler GTW 2/6 diesel two-car units). The trains run every hour daily, from 6:23 in the morning until 23:23 in the evening. The Agios Andreas–Rio route has two bus connections at Kastellokampos—to Agios Vasileios and the General University Hospital of Patras via the University of Patras.

References

External links
Οργανισμός Σιδηροδρόμων Ελλάδος (ΟΣΕ) - GTP

Buildings and structures in Patras
Railway stations in Achaea
Railway stations opened in 1954
1954 establishments in Greece
Transport in Patras